James Allen Schmerer (June 14, 1938 – October 4, 2019) was an American television producer, screenwriter and author, best known for his work on popular action, western and crime drama television programs of the seventies and eighties.

Career
After graduating from New York University with a bachelor's degree in motion picture production in 1960, Schmerer moved to Hollywood in 1961 and began his career as an assistant editor on the Mike Wallace-narrated series Biography, before becoming a production coordinator on another documentary series, also produced by David L. Wolper, Hollywood and the Stars. He joined the Writers Guild of America West, in 1965. In 1966, alongside producer Irving Allen, he made his jump into fiction, serving as associate producer on The Silencers, the first film in Dean Martin's Matt Helm franchise. While he didn't work on the three following films, he would work with the character on the small screen, writing three episodes of the ABC television series.

Three years later, now working as head of Creative Development at Xanadu Productions, Schmerer reputedly became the youngest producer of a prime time US television series, at the time, when he was hired by David Dortort to replace William Claxton as producer on the final two seasons of NBC's The High Chaparral at the age of 31. A decision Kent McCray felt was "a big mistake," as a relative newcomer, Schmerer frequently found himself at odds with the studio, later admitting that he was "constantly going up against the networks and the studios when they wanted me to do something I knew wasn't right." One such incident surrounded his insistence on killing Native people on the series, despite NBC demanding otherwise due to protests from Native groups, as he believed that since the show took place in 1880s Arizona, "there were hostile Indians out there." Tensions during Schmerer's run on the series were also high between him and the cast, particularly after he fired one of the series' main characters, Mark Slade (Billy Blue), without warning, after he had requested to be used less at the beginning of season four in order to complete production on a feature film.

Throughout the seventies Schmerer wrote episodes for a variety of television genres, including his debut into animation, with the Star Trek: The Animated Series episode "The Survivor". The episode is the only canon episode to mention Dr. McCoy's daughter, Joanna, a character originating in the writer's guide of the original series, who was famously written out of the third season episode "The Way to Eden". Additionally, this episode marked the first animated appearances of M'Ress, Gabler and the Romulans. The episode was later novelized by Alan Dean Foster in Star Trek Log 2.

In 1985, he began his work on MacGyver, where he would stay on as a story consultant and writer through most of the first season. Amongst his contributions to the series included the introduction of Dana Elcar's character Peter Thornton (episode: "Nightmares") and Teri Hatcher's Penny Parker (episode: "Every Time She Smiles").

Following his work in television, Schmerer began teaching in the professional program of screenwriting at UCLA's School of Theater, Film, and Television. He would also oversee courses at The Meisner-Carville School of Acting and provide seminars around the country. His pupils included In a later attempt to "try another discipline" and push his skills, he wrote the detective mystery novel Twisted Shadows, published May 9, 2000. Unfortunately, despite having two sequels in mind, he ultimately did not write any further installments in the series.

Personal life and death
In October 2019, at the age of 81, Schmerer died in his home, following a stroke.

Partial filmography

As writer

As producer

Bibliography
 Twisted Shadows (iUniverse, Incorporated, 2000)

References

External links

1938 births
2019 deaths
American television producers
American television writers
American male television writers